2000 Market Street is a high-rise office building located in the Market West region of Philadelphia. It is currently tied with Two Logan Square as the 17th-tallest building in Philadelphia. The architect of the building was Pitcairn Properties, Inc.

Tenants
 Santander Bank
 Fox Rothschild LLP
 The Board of Pensions of the Presbyterian Church (USA)
 The Coventry Deli
 John Dolan Enterprises, LLC
 Marshall Dennehey Warner Coleman & Goggin, P.C.
 Philadelphia office of US Senator Bob Casey Jr.
 Weber Gallagher  Inc
 FCA Inc. Architecture, Planning, and Design

See also

 List of tallest buildings in Philadelphia
 Buildings and architecture of Philadelphia

References

External links
 Emporis
 SkyscraperPage 

Skyscraper office buildings in Philadelphia
Office buildings completed in 1973